Razin Dul (also Romanized as Razīn Dūl; also known as Zarrīn Dūl) is a village in Shanderman Rural District, Shanderman District, Masal County, Gilan Province, Iran. At the 2006 census, its population was 95, in 28 families.

References 

Populated places in Masal County